Kamil Masztak (born 16 July 1984 in Białystok) is a Polish sprinter. He competed in the 4 × 100 m relay event at the 2012 Summer Olympics.

Competition record

References

Sportspeople from Białystok
Polish male sprinters
1984 births
Living people
Olympic athletes of Poland
Athletes (track and field) at the 2012 Summer Olympics
Universiade medalists in athletics (track and field)
Universiade silver medalists for Poland
Medalists at the 2009 Summer Universiade
21st-century Polish people